The 2008 European U23 Judo Championships is an edition of the European U23 Judo Championships, organised by the International Judo Federation. It was held in Zagreb, Croatia from 21 to 23 November 2008.

Medal summary

Medal table

Men's events

Women's events

Source Results

References

External links
 

European U23 Judo Championships
 U23
European Championships, U23
Judo
Judo in Croatia
Judo
Judo, European Championships U23